is a former Japanese football player. He played for Japan national team.

Club career
Yamada was educated at and played for Shimizu Commercial High School. At the high school, he won the national high school championship and the national youth championship with his team mates including Hiroshi Nanami, Go Oiwa and Shigeyoshi Mochizuki. Some scouts regarded him as the No. 1 high school player of his age.

After graduating in 1990, he joined Japan Soccer League side Nissan Motors where his powerful dribbling helped him quickly establish himself as a regular. When Japan's first-ever professional league J1 League started in 1992, Nissan Motors was transformed to Yokohama Marinos for whom he continued to play.

He moved to Kyoto Purple Sanga in 1998, and then to Verdy Kawasaki in 1999. He announced the retirement from the game after the 1999 season at the age of 29. However, Hidehiko Shimizu, the manager of J2 League side Vegalta Sendai, who had also managed Yamada at Yokohama Marinos, successfully persuaded him to come out of the retirement and help Sendai to gain the promotion to J1 League. Yamada played for Sendai for 3 years from June 2000 to June 2003 before finally hanging up his boots. He was the leader and the influential player for Sendai who were promoted to J1 League for the 2002 season.

National team career
Yamada was capped once for the Japanese national team when he played in a friendly against Australia on September 27, 1994 at the Tokyo National Stadium. He was a member of the Japan team that won the 1992 Asian Cup but did not play in the tournament.

After retirement
After retiring from the game, Yamada started his own business, a franchise chain of bakeries specialising in melonpans, in Sendai. After exiting the business, he now runs an Irish pub in downtown Tokyo as of July 2018.

Club statistics

National team statistics

Honors and awards

Team honours
 1992 Asian Cup (Champions)

References

External links
 
 Japan National Football Team Database
 

1972 births
Living people
Association football people from Osaka Prefecture
People from Takatsuki, Osaka
Japanese footballers
Japan international footballers
Japan Soccer League players
J1 League players
J2 League players
Yokohama F. Marinos players
Kyoto Sanga FC players
Tokyo Verdy players
Vegalta Sendai players
1992 AFC Asian Cup players
AFC Asian Cup-winning players
Association football midfielders
Footballers at the 1994 Asian Games
Asian Games competitors for Japan